Glasson may refer to:

Places
 Glasson, Bowness, in Cumbria, England
 Glasson, Maryport, in Cumbria, England
 Glasson Dock, in Lancashire, England
 Glassan, in County Westmeath, Ireland (also the Village of the Roses)

Other uses
 Glasson (surname)